Daniil Andriyovych Syemilyet (born 7 March 2001) is a Ukrainian professional footballer who plays as a midfielder for Vorskla Poltava in the Ukrainian Premier League.

Career
Syemilyet is a product of Metalist Kharkiv, Youth Sportive School Vinnytsia and Vorskla Poltava systems. 

In summer 2020 he was promoted to the main squad of Vorskla Poltava. He made his debut as a start squad player for Vorskla Poltava in the Ukrainian Premier League in an away draw match against FC Lviv on 3 July 2020.

References

External links
 
 

2001 births
Living people
Footballers from Zhytomyr
Ukrainian footballers
Association football midfielders
FC Vorskla Poltava players
FC Hirnyk-Sport Horishni Plavni players
Ukrainian Premier League players